Nationality words link to articles with information on the nation's poetry or literature (for instance, Irish or France).

Events

Works published

Births
Death years link to the corresponding "[year] in poetry" article. There are conflicting or unreliable sources for the birth years of many people born in this period; where sources conflict, the poet is listed again and the conflict is noted:

983:
 Gunnlaugr ormstunga (died 1008), Icelandic skald

987:
 Liu Yong (died 1053), Song

Deaths
Birth years link to the corresponding "[year] in poetry" article:

983:
 Minamoto no Shitagō 源順 (born 911), Japanese waka poet, scholar and nobleman; one of the Five Men of the Pear Chamber and Thirty-six Poetry Immortals of Japan; author of the  poetry collection; some scholars claim that he also wrote the Taketori Monogatari; original compiler of the Wamyō Ruijushō, the first extant Japanese dictionary organized into semantic headings

985:
 Kishi Joō 徽子女王 (born 929), Japanese waka poet and noblewoman; one of the Thirty-six Poetry Immortals

See also

 Poetry
 10th century in poetry
 10th century in literature
 List of years in poetry

Other events:
 Other events of the 12th century
 Other events of the 13th century

10th century:
 10th century in poetry
 10th century in literature

Notes

10th-century poetry
Poetry